Dichiseni is a commune in Călărași County, Muntenia, Romania with 1,734 inhabitants (2011 census). It is composed of four villages: Coslogeni, Dichiseni, Libertatea and Satnoeni.

References

Dichiseni
Localities in Muntenia